This is a list of tennis players who have represented the Croatia Davis Cup team in an official Davis Cup match. Croatia have taken part in the competition since 1993. Previously, Croatians were members of the Yugoslavia Davis Cup team.

Players

References

Lists of Davis Cup tennis players
Davis Cup